Tom Mason  is an American actor.

He began his television career in 1977, portraying Rex Stout's fictional detective Archie Goodwin in the ABC-TV movie Nero Wolfe. His subsequent TV credits include the series Grandpa Goes to Washington, Freebie and the Bean (1980), George Washington (1984), Our Family Honor (1985–1986), Jack and Mike (1986–1987), Party of Five (1994–2000), The Bedford Diaries (2006) and The Black Donnellys (2007). Mason's episodic credits include Law & Order, The Practice, 100 Centre Street and The Sopranos.

Mason's film credits include Apocalypse Now (1979), The Aliens Are Coming (1980), Return of the Man from U.N.C.L.E. (1983), Crimes of the Heart (1986), Men Don't Leave (1990), F/X2 (1991), Jonathan: The Boy Nobody Wanted (1992), The Amy Fisher Story (1993), Final Appeal (1993), Greedy (1994), Flashfire (1994), The Puppet Masters (1994), Brooklyn Lobster (2005) and Flags of Our Fathers (2006).

In the HBO television movie, Too Big to Fail (2011), Mason portrayed AIG chairman and CEO Bob Willumstad.

References

External links
 
 
 

American male film actors
American male television actors
Living people
20th-century American male actors
21st-century American male actors
1949 births